Perillene is a natural monoterpene that consists of a furan ring with a six-carbon homoprenyl side chain. Perillene is a component of the essential oil obtained by extraction of the leaves of Perilla frutescens. Perillene has also been obtained by steam distillation of the leaves of Perilla frutescens. Perillene has been found to elicit distinct electrophysiological responses in the antennae of the apple blossom weevil. It has been suggested that perillene is one several terpene hydrocarbons in the emanation bouquet of apple tree buds which may be used by adult weevils as chemical cues to discrimination during host-searching behavior.

Applications 

Perillene, as an active ingredient of perilla oil, has been claimed to have anti-inflammatory and bactericidal action.

See also 
 Perilla ketone

References 

3-Furyl compounds
Monoterpenes